Joshua Adjutant (born 1995) is a New Hampshire politician.

Early life
Adjutant was born in Lebanon, New Hampshire in 1995.

Education
Adjutant graduated from Newfound Regional High School in 2013. Adjutant attended Plymouth State University.

Professional career
On November 6, 2018, Adjutant was elected to the New Hampshire House of Representatives where he represents the Grafton 17 district. Adjutant assumed office on December 5, 2018. Adjutant is a Democrat. Adjutant endorsed Bernie Sanders in the 2020 Democratic Party presidential primaries.

Personal life
Adjutant resides in Enfield, New Hampshire.

References

Living people
1995 births
People from Lebanon, New Hampshire
People from Ashland, New Hampshire
Plymouth State University alumni
Democratic Party members of the New Hampshire House of Representatives
21st-century American politicians